Nauman Anwar (born 12 October 1995) is a Pakistani cricketer. He represents Sialkot Stallions in domestic circuit. He was leading scorer (270) in his debut 2015 Haier Super 8 T20 Cup. He had played just 4 First-class, 3 List A and 5 Twenty20 games before being selected in the Pakistan squad for the Zimbabwe series in 2015.

He made his Twenty20 International debut for Pakistan against Zimbabwe in Lahore on 24 May 2015 and scored a whirlwind 18 off 10 balls.

He was the leading run-scorer for Lahore Whites in the 2018–19 Quaid-e-Azam One Day Cup, with 286 runs in seven matches.

References

External links

1995 births
Living people
Pakistani cricketers
Pakistan Twenty20 International cricketers
Sialkot Stallions cricketers
Cricketers from Gujranwala
Karachi Kings cricketers
Lahore Whites cricketers
Central Punjab cricketers
Wicket-keepers